The Science Fictional Solar System is a 1979 anthology of science fiction short-stories revolving around the Solar System. Its editors are Isaac Asimov, Charles G. Waugh, and Martin H. Greenberg.

Contents

1979 anthologies
Martin H. Greenberg anthologies
Harper & Row books